Ragnvald Alfred Roscher Lund (24 February 1899 – 23 October 1975)  was a Norwegian military officer, with the rank of colonel. He was a military attaché at the Norwegian legation in Stockholm in 1940. He served as head of the Office FO II at the Norwegian High Command in exile in London during World War II, responsible for Military Intelligence.

After the Second World War  Roscher Lund served  as  an advisor to the first United Nations Secretary General, Trygve Lie. He was the father of novelist and playwright Vera Henriksen.

References

1899 births
1975 deaths
Norwegian military attachés
Norwegian cryptographers
Norwegian Army personnel of World War II